The Illuminating Engineering Society (IES), formerly the Illuminating Engineering Society of North America (IESNA), is an industry-backed, not-for-profit, learned society that was founded in New York City on January 10, 1906. The IES's stated mission is "to improve the lighted environment by bringing together those with lighting knowledge and by translating that knowledge into actions that benefit the public".

The Society is still headquartered in New York City, with offices at 120 Wall Street. The IES is divided into approximately 100 local sections.

Publications

The IES is credited with over 100 publications on the subject of lighting such as The Lighting Handbook: 10th Edition. Other publications, many of which are American National Standards Institute (ANSI) or ASHRAE standards, include recommended practices for a variety of specific lighting applications such as office, sports, and outdoor lighting, and lighting for healthcare facilities. The National Institute of Standards and Technology (NIST) references several IES publications for Optical Radiation Calibrations. The International Dark-Sky Association (IDA) makes several references to the IES and its publications in its Outdoor Lighting Code Handbook.

The Illuminating Engineer could be considered the first journal of the society. One of the founders, E. Leavenworth Elliott, had begun publishing it late in 1905—just prior to the founding. He described it as "a technical journal devoted to the use of artificial light".

The society's present-day journal, LEUKOS (originally the Journal of the Illuminating Engineering Society from 1971 to 2004) is published by Taylor & Francis with four issues per year.

LD+A (from Lighting, Design + Application) is the IES's monthly magazine. It is free to members.

Illumination Awards

Annually since 1973, the IES Illumination Awards program has recognized individual engineers and lighting designers for meritorious original design in a nominated project. While local sections may offer their own awards, there are five international award categories:
 The Edwin F. Guth Memorial Award for Interior Lighting Design
 The Outdoor Lighting Design Award sponsored by Eaton's Cooper Lighting Business, formerly the Paul Waterbury Award for Outdoor Lighting Design
 The Energy and Environmental Design Award sponsored by Osram Sylvania
 The Lighting Control Innovation Award, sponsored by the NEMA's Lighting Controls Association
 The Aileen Page Cutler Memorial Award for Residential Lighting Design

See also

Notable members

 David DiLaura
 Thomas Edison (Honorary)
 Beatrice Irwin
 Kaoru Mende

Related organizations
 Alliance to Save Energy (ASE)
 Chartered Institution of Building Services Engineers (CIBSE)
 Institution of Lighting Professionals (ILP)
 International Association of Lighting Designers (IALD)
 International Commission on Illumination (CIE)
 Professional Lighting Designers' Association (PLDA)

References

External links
 The Inter-Society Color Council records  at Hagley Museum and Library contain some records from the Illuminating Engineering Society.

Lighting organizations
Engineering societies based in the United States
Learned societies of the United States
Architectural lighting design